The Fool on the Hill is a ballet created by the British choreographer, Gillian Lynne.

Television production 

In 1975 Gillian Lynne arrived in Australia to create The Australian Ballet's first work expressly commissioned for television which was jointly commissioned by The Australian Ballet and the Australian Broadcasting Corporation. The Fool on the Hill ballet was inspired by the Beatles' song of the same name, and the score was arranged and orchestrated by John Lanchbery, using interpretations of Beatles' songs and featuring characters like Eleanor Rigby, and Sergeant Pepper. The director of the television production was Bryan Ashbridge. Robert Helpmann appeared as Sergeant Pepper in the original television ballet.

The ballet won a number of international television awards.

Stage production 

The ballet was later revised for stage performances. It premiered as a live stage production at the Sydney Opera House on 28 April 1976.

Notes and references 

Australian Broadcasting Corporation original programming
1976 in Australian television
1976 ballet premieres
The Australian Ballet
Ballet in Australia